Thaumatodon is a genus of minute air-breathing land snails, terrestrial pulmonate gastropod mollusks in the family Endodontidae.

Species 
Species in the genus Thaumatodon include:
 Thaumatodon decemplicata
 Thaumatodon hystricelloides
 Thaumatodon multilamellata

References

 Nomenclator Zoologicus info

Endodontidae
Taxa named by Henry Augustus Pilsbry
Gastropod genera
Taxonomy articles created by Polbot